The Canadian Harvard Aircraft Association (CHAA) is an all-volunteer non-profit charitable organization based in Tillsonburg, Ontario. It was founded with the aim of acquiring, preserving, restoring, maintaining, displaying and demonstrating the North American Harvard aircraft and other training aircraft associated with the Royal Canadian Air Force.

History
The association was founded in 1985 at a small grass airstrip in Woodstock, Ontario, by a group of Harvard enthusiasts determined to preserve the aircraft type. CHAA moved to Tillsonburg in the late eighties.

Today, there are fewer than 50 Harvards flying in Canada, and most of them are associated with CHAA.

Aircraft 
CHAA currently has ten aircraft.

References

External links
 Canadian Harvard Aircraft Association - home page
 Canadian Harvard Aircraft Association Dive Recovery Team

Non-profit organizations based in Ontario
Tillsonburg
Historic preservation organizations in Canada